Michael Stryphnos was a high-ranking Byzantine official under the Angeloi emperors. 

Stryphnos is first attested in 1192 as sebastos and the head of the vestiarion (the imperial treasury), under Emperor Isaac II Angelos (reigned 1185–1195). Stryphnos then married Theodora, the daughter of Andronikos Kamateros and sister of Empress Euphrosyne Doukaina Kamatera, the wife of Emperor Alexios III Angelos (r. 1195–1203) and through this connection advanced to the position of megas doux, commander-in-chief of the Byzantine navy, when the latter ascended the throne. The contemporary historian Niketas Choniates portrays him as a man of "extraordinary rapacity and rare dishonesty" (Guilland), who used his position to sell off the sails, anchors and other equipment of the fleet, down to the very nails of the ships. His actions marked the effective end of the Byzantine fleet, which was hence unable to resist the Fourth Crusade a few years later.

As megas doux, he was also the governor of the joint province of Hellas and Peloponnese (southern mainland Greece), and in this capacity he went to Athens ca. 1201–1202 to oppose the rising power of Leo Sgouros, a local magnate turned autonomous ruler. He does not seem to have succeeded in checking Sgouros, but the local bishop, Michael Choniates, nevertheless composed an encomium in his honour. Three seals of Stryphnos survive, as well as a large enamelled gold ring, possibly given to him on his appointment as megas doux.

References

Sources 

 

12th-century births
13th-century deaths
12th-century Byzantine people
13th-century Byzantine people
Megaloi doukes
Byzantine governors of Hellas
Byzantine governors of the Peloponnese
Byzantine officials
Sebastoi